Hori Naokata may refer to:

Hori Naokata (Muramatsu) (1767-1805), daimyō of Muramatsu Domain
Hori Naokata (Suzaka) (1743-1779), daimyō of Suzaka Domain

See also
Hori clan